The 49th Annual Martín Fierro Awards, presented by the Asociación de Periodistas de la Televisión y Radiofonía Argentina (APTRA), was held on June 23, 2019. It was held at the Hilton Buenos Aires located in Buenos Aires. During the ceremony, APTRA announced the Martín Fierro Awards for 2018 Argentine television and radio programs. The ceremony was hosted by Marley and was broadcast on Telefe. Telefe had broadcast the previous years awards.

The shortlists were announced on May 13 on the  program.

The singer Tini opened the ceremony with a musical act, performing her song "22".

Awards
Winners are listed first and highlighted in boldface. Other nominations are listed in alphabetic order.

In Memoriam 
As is tradition an in memoriam segment tribute was paid to the artists who had died between June 2018 and June 2019. The Venezuelan singer Ricardo Montaner sung the song "" authored by the singer-songwriter Alberto Cortez who was one of those artist being remembered. The song was sung while images of the deceased artists were shown.

However, a number of names were missing from the list, including Guillermo Bredeston. Before the Golden Martín Fierro announcement president of APTRA, got on stage to apologize blaming a digital error for the omissions before playing the video again with the missing artists added.

References

2018 in Argentine television
2019 in Argentina
2019 television awards
Argentina culture-related lists